Emem Edem (born 15 October 1983) is a retired Nigerian sprinter who specialized in the 100 metres.

She finished fifth in the 100 metres at the 1999 World Youth Championships, and also competed in the 200 metres there. On the regional scene she finished sixth in the 100 metres and won a gold medal in the 4 × 100 metres relay at the 2003 All-Africa Games.

References

1983 births
Living people
Nigerian female sprinters
African Games gold medalists for Nigeria
African Games medalists in athletics (track and field)
Athletes (track and field) at the 2003 All-Africa Games
Place of birth missing (living people)
21st-century Nigerian women